August Schrader (1807–1894) was a German-American inventor and mechanic. He is known for inventing the Schrader valve.

Life 
Schrader immigrated from Germany to the United States and opened a shop dealing in rubber products in Manhattan, New York City. His original shop was located at 115 John Street.

In 1845, he began supplying fittings and valves for rubber products made by the Goodyear Brothers, including air pillows and life preservers. He also made daguerreotype apparatus. Then he went into partnership with Christian Baecher, a brass turner and finisher.

After watching divers at work, Schrader sought to improve diving helmets. In 1849, he created a new copper helmet. Later, his interest in diving led to him to design an air pump.

Around 1890, after reports of English cyclists' success using pneumatic tires, August Schrader saw the need for a bicycle tire valve. By 1891 he had produced the Schrader valve, which was his most popular invention and is used today. August's son, George, is generally credited with the experimental work that resulted in the valve's creation.

In 1893, Schrader patented the tire valve cap.

As with the introduction of the bicycle, early automobiles had solid wheels similar to those on carriages, followed by solid hard rubber. In time, tubed pneumatic tires and Schrader valves were introduced to cars, trucks, and motorcycles. Most of these ultimately went tubeless, but retained Schrader valves. For comparison, it should be compared with the Presta valve.

References and notes

External links 

Schrader-Bridgeport website
Historical Schrader equipment
Land and Sea Collection: 1917 SCHRADER NAVY MK V DIVING HELMET
Schrader valve patent - US495064A

1807 births
1894 deaths
19th-century American inventors
German emigrants to the United States